Mohamed Ould Abdel Aziz ( Muḥammad Wald 'Abd al-'Azīz; born 20 December 1956) is a former Mauritanian politician who was the 8th President of Mauritania, in office from 2009 to 2019. A career soldier and high-ranking officer, he was a leading figure in the August 2005 coup that deposed President Maaouya Ould Sid'Ahmed Taya, and in August 2008 he led another coup, which toppled President Sidi Ould Cheikh Abdallahi. Following the 2008 coup, Abdel Aziz became President of the High Council of State as part of what was described as a political transition leading to a new election. He resigned from that post in April 2009 in order to stand as a candidate in the July 2009 presidential election, which he won. He was sworn in on 5 August 2009. He was subsequently re-elected in 2014, then did not seek re-election in 2019. He was succeeded by Mohamed Ould Ghazouani, who assumed office on 1 August 2019.

Abdel Aziz also served as the Chairman of the African Union from 2014 to 2015. In June 2021, Abdel Aziz was jailed months after he was charged with corruption.

Early life
Mohamed Ould Abdel Aziz was born in Akjoujt on 20 December 1956. He joined the Meknes Royal Military Academy in Morocco in 1977, and, after a string of promotions, established the elite BASEP (Presidential Security Battalion). He played a key role in suppressing an attempted coup in June 2003 and a military uprising in August 2004. He received Mauritania's highest military award for his role in stopping the 2004 uprising.

2005 coup leader

A military coup on 3 August 2005, led by Ely Ould Mohamed Vall, Director-General of the Sûreté Nationale, and Colonel Abdel Aziz, who was commander of the Presidential Guard (BASEP), overthrew President Maaouya Ould Sid'Ahmed Taya.  Colonel Abdel Aziz was one of the main actors in the actual carrying out of this coup.
At the time, Abdel Aziz was described by a Western academic as a leader of a Mauritanian Nasserist group, pan-Arab secular nationalists. Western sources, citing Abdel Aziz's background in coming from a traditionally favored Oulad Bou Sbaa Chorfa clan group, questioned the general's commitment to democracy and reversing the history of ethnic and class inequities in the nation.

Contrary to this, the Mauritanian press credited Abdel Aziz for pushing to reduce military rule from 24 to 19 months and for attempting to limit voter fraud in the coming election.

Under President Sidi Ould Cheikh Abdallahi
On 30 August 2007, President Abdallahi named Abdel Aziz his Presidential Chief of Staff (Chef d'Etat-major particulier du Président de la République). Abdel Aziz, now a General, continued to work closely with the President: at the end of February 2008 he served as a personal envoy of the President to King Mohammed VI of Morocco. General Abdel Aziz was also commander of the forces sent to apprehend Group for Preaching and Combat militants who had killed four French tourists at Aleg in December 2007.

A May 2008 article contrasted Abdel Aziz's continuing involvement at the centre of political power with Ely Ould Mohamed Vall, who had left public life.  Abdel Aziz remained both advisor to the President and General, and was described as being at the nexus of "a small galaxy of other colonels, businessmen and politicians, in an uneasy balance."

A conflict with the President was clearly growing in June 2008. At the end of June, the left-wing UFP party reported that they believed Abdel Aziz and Ould Elghazouani were planning for a coup, but were attempting a strategy of political change by hiving "independent" parliamentarians off from the government, which would replace the President peacefully.

A mass defection in the ranks of the ruling PNDD-ADIL party on 4 August 2008 (two days before the coup) with 25 Parliamentary deputies and 23 senators was reported to have been inspired by military leaders, and would have left the president unable to govern.

2008 coup leader

6 August coup d'état
On 6 August 2008, Abdel Aziz was ordered removed by Abdallahi from his command, along with several senior officers including General Muhammad Ould Al-Ghazwani, General Felix Negri, and Brigadier General (Aqid) Ahmad Ould Bakri. The first announcement of the State Council was to annul this decree.

By 9:20 local time, BASEP troops seized the President, Prime Minister, and Interior Minister in the capital, Nouakchott.  Mauritania television was taken off the air earlier, but Arabia-based al-Arabiya television played an announcement said to be from the new junta. According to an official statement released on 7 August Abdallahi's powers were terminated and Mauritania would be governed on a transitional basis by an 11-member High Council of State, with Abdel Aziz as the president of the council, until a new presidential election was held "as soon as possible".

Transition
Public reaction to the 2008 coup by western governments in the days after 6 August were hostile, with particularly harsh condemnation coming from former colonial power and past economic supporter France. In the two weeks following the coup, Abdel Aziz met with a number of foreign delegations, made personal phone calls to foreign leaders, and gave a number of press interviews to the international media. In these he stated that his actions were legal, a response to "anti-constitutional" oppression by the previous government, and that although "forced to take power" he had no desire for power. He did not rule out running in the promised elections, however. A Saudi-based newspaper claimed that the General was motivated by a combination of disgust at the corruption of those close to Abdallahi, but also over legal threats against Abdel Aziz and others by the president regarding the behavior of the Mauritanian military during the mass expulsion of black Africans in 1989.

Abdel Aziz's initial list of names for the High Council of State included five civilians, released on 7 August along with a statement that former government ministers could retain their jobs. By the end of the same day, this list had been revised, without public explanation, to include all military figures. Two small demonstrations were held on the day following the coup: one opposing the seizure of power, which was dispersed by the police with tear gas, and one march supporting the military, at which Abdel Aziz spoke. At that demonstration, marchers already carried life size photographs of Abdel Aziz in military uniform. Within a week, a majority of the Mauritanian parliament voted to authorise the coup, and on the 13th, Abdel Aziz signed a decree appointing Moulaye Ould Mohamed Laghdaf as Prime Minister of Mauritania. The Council stated that Abdel Aziz had the power to appoint the prime minister, military officials and civil servants in Mauritania.

Stabilisation
Neighboring support was somewhat forthcoming, with Morocco's government press calling Abdel Aziz a patriot an advisor of the Moroccan king coming to Nouakchott to meet with Abdul Aziz, and Libya and Senegal eventually pronounced their support for the new government. In contrast, the Algerian government has stridently opposed the coup, even while quietly receiving a visit from Abdel Aziz's close ally and the new Mauritanian Chief of Armed Forces, Muhammad Ould Al-Ghazwani, and has attempted to rally the African Union and Arab states against Abdelaziz.

The United States has consistently issued press releases from the Department of State condemning the coup d’état as illegal and unconstitutional. The African Union has issued condemnation of General Aziz as well as travel bans and the freezing of assets of Aziz and those connected with the coup and the illegal seizure of the Mauritanian government.

The BBC has pointed out that the General, who was previously seen as a supporting player in the 2005 coup, is now seen as having been the power behind the previous junta.  It was also noted that the General, never seen without his military uniform, is already addressed by government staff as "president". An ally of Abdel Aziz was quoted saying "He's a simple man, who likes order."  Apart from deriding corruption and government inaction, Abdel Aziz stressed his opposition to Islamic fundamentalism. An internet threat, released on 12 August, alleged to be from Al-Qaeda threatened the coup leaders, and General Abdel Aziz took the opportunity to stress his fidelity to the anti-terrorist operation which the United States government had funded in Mauritania since 2003 but suspended following the 6 August coup.

2009 presidential election

The coup government of General Ould Abdel Aziz promised that it would hold a free and fair election for president on 6 June 2009.  On 5 February 2009, Mauritanian state media reported that the General would stand as a candidate for president in that election.
Despite this attempt to legitimise the post-coup government, the African Union carried out a sanctions regime first agreed on 22 December 2008, and continued to recognise Abdallahi as the Mauritanian Head of State. The largest opposition parties initially refused to take part in the election, calling it "predetermined" and a "farce". Ould Abdel Aziz headed a list of sanctions targets by the African Union which was put into effect on 6 February 2009.  The sanctions against government and military officials who backed the August coup prevent travel to AU nations, the issuing of visas or travel documents to these individuals, and the seizure of bank assets within AU nations.

In order to stand as a candidate in the presidential election, Abdel Aziz was required to step down as Head of State. He did so on 15 April, as expected, and the President of the Senate, Ba Mamadou Mbare, succeeded him in an interim capacity. Members of the opposition decried the move, saying the General was retaining real power.  Mohamed Ould Mouloud, a leader in the National Front for the Defence of Democracy (FNDD) opposition coalition, was quoted in the foreign press as saying: "It's a false resignation, a pretend resignation that the general is doing to trick public opinion and have people accept the putsch."

The Union for the Republic political party elected Abdel Aziz as its president at the party's constituent assembly on 5 May 2009. In the presidential election held on 18 July 2009, Abdel Aziz won a first-round majority of 52.58%. He then resigned as party leader on 2 August 2009, as the President of Mauritania cannot be a member of any party.

Abdel Aziz was sworn in as president at a ceremony held in Nouakchott on 5 August 2009.

2012 shooting
Abdel Aziz was non-fatally shot on 13 October 2012. Reports are conflicting as to where on his body Abdel Aziz was shot and whether the incident was an accident or an assassination attempt. The country's Communications Minister, Hamdi Ould Mahjoub, reported that the president was shot in the arm, while Reuters medical sources said it was in the abdomen. Initially, Mauritanian radio reported that Abdel Aziz survived an assassination attempt, but Abdel Aziz subsequently said that he was accidentally shot by an army unit and was successfully operated on for minor injuries. Witnesses claim Abdel Aziz was directly targeted by men who ran away after the shooting. Abdel Aziz received an initial operation at a military hospital in the Mauritanian capital of Nouakchott, and then, according to the French defense ministry, would be transferred to Percy-Clamart military hospital in Paris for additional treatment.

Corruption 
In March 2021, a judge charged Abdel Aziz and 10 other people in his inner circle, including one of his son-in-law, several former prime ministers and businessmen, with corruption. One of his lawyers then revealed that Abdel Aziz refused to answer any questions from the judge. On 23 June 2021, a prosecutor speaking on condition of anonymity and the spokesman of the former president's party Djibril Ould Bilal confirmed that a judge transferred Abdel Aziz from house arrest to jail after he refused to cooperate with police.

On December 29, 2021, Abdel Aziz was admitted to Nouakchott Military Hospital where he successfully underwent heart surgery. According to his lawyer, Abdel Aziz had fallen ill and suffered nose bleeds. In a statement released on the 29th, Abdel Aziz's family claimed that the former president's poor health came as a result of the corruption scandal, stating that they "fear for his physical liquidation" by the regime which "failed in its attempts to liquidate him politically."

Later elections

Abdel Aziz stood for re-election in 2014, which he won over Biram Dah Abeid, with nearly 82% of the popular vote.

Abdel Aziz did not stand for re-election in 2019, and was peacefully succeeded by Mohamed Ould Ghazouani.

References

External links

Political transition in Mauritania: Assessment and horizons. Middle East/North Africa Report N°53. International Crisis Group (ICG) 24 April 2006.

1956 births
History of Mauritania
Leaders who took power by coup
Living people
Mauritanian Muslims
People from Inchiri Region
Shooting survivors
Heads of state of Mauritania
Union for the Republic (Mauritania) politicians